Harris Township is one of the twelve townships of Ottawa County, Ohio, United States.  The 2000 census found 3,009 people in the township, 1,583 of whom lived in the unincorporated portions of the township.

Geography
Located in the southwestern part of the county, it borders the following townships:
Benton Township - north
Salem Township - east
Rice Township, Sandusky County - southeast corner
Washington Township, Sandusky County - south
Woodville Township, Sandusky County - southwest
Clay Township - northwest

Most of the village of Elmore is located in the western part of the township.

The Portage River and the Ohio Turnpike also pass through Harris Township.

Name and history
It is the only Harris Township statewide.

Government
The township is governed by a three-member board of trustees, who are elected in November of odd-numbered years to a four-year term beginning on the following January 1. Two are elected in the year after the presidential election and one is elected in the year before it. There is also an elected township fiscal officer, who serves a four-year term beginning on April 1 of the year after the election, which is held in November of the year before the presidential election. Vacancies in the fiscal officership or on the board of trustees are filled by the remaining trustees.

References

External links
County website

Townships in Ottawa County, Ohio
Townships in Ohio